Egnell is a Swedish surname. Notable people with the surname include:

 Claes Egnell (1916–2012), Swedish sport shooter and modern pentathlete
 Viktor Egnell (1872–1952), Swedish politician

Swedish-language surnames